Neil R. Grabois (born 1935) is a mathematician and a former university administrator. He held positions as the dean, provost, and chair of the department of mathematical sciences of Williams College; as the thirteenth President of Colgate University, from 1988 to 1999; as Vice President at the Carnegie Corporation in New York; and as the dean of the Milano School of International Affairs, Management, and Urban Policy at The New School, where he served from 2010 until his departure in 2013.

He received his doctorate from the University of Pennsylvania after attending Swarthmore College. He graduated from Stuyvesant High School in 1953. Grabois currently sits on the boards of Project Pericles, Swarthmore College, The Jewish Foundation for the Education of Women and the Michael Wolk Heart Foundation.  He is an adjunct faculty member of Teachers College at Columbia University.

He and his wife Miriam have two children and one grandchild.

References 

Presidents of Colgate University
Grabois, Neil R.
Grabois, Neil R.
Grabois, Neil R.
Grabois, Neil R.
Williams College faculty
Grabois, Neil R.
Mathematics educators
Teachers College, Columbia University faculty